Emma Gramatica (born Aida Laura Argia Gramatica; 25 October 1874 – 8 November 1965) was an Italian stage and film actress. She appeared in 29 films between 1919 and 1962. She was born in Borgo San Donnino, today Fidenza, Province of Parma and died in Ostia. Her sisters Irma and Anna were also actresses.

Filmography

References

External links

1874 births
1965 deaths
People from Fidenza
Italian stage actresses
Italian film actresses
20th-century Italian actresses